William (Bill, Will) Henry Strahan (21 September 1869 – 25 April 1915) was a member of the Toodyay Road Board who served with the 16th Battalion of AIF. He was killed in action on 25 April 1915 (the first day of the Gallipoli Campaign). Prior to enlisting with AIF Strahan was a volunteer member of the Australian Light Horse and Guildford Rifles where he held the rank of sergeant major.

Strahan wrote The Bugle Call, which was published several times after his death. The verses were sent to King George V, prompting the response from the palace that Strahan had "acted up ... to the spirit of his utterances".

Personal life

Strahan was born on 21 September 1869, the son of James Strahan (1837–1918) and Susannah née Straghan (1841–1900), and grew up on the  farm and  family orchard in Toodyay. In 1895 he purchased the orchard from his father. Strahan married Ruth Ellen Monger (1872–1936) (the cousin of John Henry Monger) at St Stephen's Anglican Church, Toodyay on 25 April 1894. They had ten children: Olive Myrtle (1895), Herbert Elwell (1896), William (Jim) James (1898), Ruth Eileen (1900), Eric Forrest (1902), Gordon Phillip (1904), Byron Henry (1907), Margaret Esther (1909), Stephen Monger (1911) and Kelvin John (1913).

Strahan served on the Toodyay Road Board and was a member of the Deepdale Fruitgrowers Association. Strahan was noted for arguing his position to his own benefit but he would concede when there was benefit to the wider community. It was this character which not only made Strahan well respected in the community but also saw him become one of the first people to enlist for the First World War.

Strahan's son, Herbert Elwell (1896–1987), also fought in France with the 39th Battalion, First Australian Imperial Force in World War I.

Military service
Around 1900 Strahan joined the Guildford Rifles and later the Australian Light Horse, where he rose to the rank of sergeant major. At the outbreak of World War I he resigned to enlist in the Australian Army. He was the 199th person to enlist in the Australian Imperial Forces. He joined the 16th Battalion "A" company on 14 September 1914 and on 1 October 1914 was promoted to sergeant. The initial training period of two months took place at Blackboy Hill in Western Australia. The army then decided that the 4th Brigade, which was made up of the 11th and 16th Battalions, was to assemble at Broadmeadows, in Victoria, to complete its organisation and training before embarkation overseas. In November, therefore, all ranks were given leave and Strahan went back to Toodyay to visit family and friends. While there he was given an official send off by the Toodyay Road Board. Each party was then transported to Broadmeadows. On 22 December 1914 Strahan, along with the 16th Battalion, embarked on Troopship A40 Ceramic for Albany, Western Australia. They reached Albany on 28 December. No shore leave was granted. At 8am on 31 December the Ceramic sailed from King George Sound in the second convoy of troops to leave Albany and arrived a month later in Egypt. After further training in Egypt the 16th Battalion was part of the initial landings at Gallipoli on 25 April 1915. Strahan was shot by a sniper and killed on that first day. He is memorialised at Lone Pine Cemetery at Gallipoli.

The Bugle Call
On 4 September 1914, prior to departing for Blackboy Hill and joining the AIF, Strahan wrote The Bugle Call. After his death the lyrics were published in various papers. Major General Sir Harry Barron, the Governor of Western Australia, sent a copy of the lyrics to the King, eliciting the response "Evidently the writer by his gallant deeds acted up not to the letter only, but to the spirit of his utterances".

Do you hear the Bugle calling, or are you deaf or blind or dumb?

Will you fight tor Flag, and Freedom, will you let the foeman come?
Will you halt, and look, and linger, will you fail your brothers now?
Or stand and fight and conquer 'neath Australia's wattle bough.

Do you hear the Bugle calling, call all men worth the name?
Will you share your Country's conflict, or hide your face in shame?
Do you hear the millions marching, 'gainst Belgium's glorious stand?
Will you lend a hand to conquer the spoilers of the land?
Do you hear the Bugle calling, calling loud, and long and shrill?
Help to stay the marching millions – there's a place that you can fill
Shall we, when History's written, like Belshazzar weighed of old
Be in the scales found wanting, our Empire to uphold.

Do you hear the Bugle calling, Come from your Farms afar;
If it's British blood that's in you, uphold our Nation's star
For tradition proudly tells us, while Britannia rules the waves
We're the British race of people – they can never make us slaves.
Do you hear the Bugle calling, don't let it call in vain?
Let your answer be 'we're coming' to our friends across the foam
For wife and child, and sweetheart and our sunny Austral home.

Do you hear the Bugle calling, do you see the foeman reel?
Gainst a line of gleaming bayonets like a glistening wall of steel
Hold the Forts, brave lads, 'We're coming' Australia's sons are true
We'll stand or fall together 'neath the Red, White and the Blue.

Do you hear the Bugle calling, we expect you to reply!
You will stake your life for freedom, you will do your best or die
And if perchance in action for you Country you should Fall
We will not forget your answer to that thrilling Bugle call.

Chorus
Australia's sons are coming, Britain never calls in vain.
Like our proud Canadian brothers
We are sons of British mothers –
That's our answer to our Foes across the Main.

See also 
 List of Australian military personnel killed at Anzac Cove on 25 April 1915

References

External links
 Australian War Memorial Roll of Honour 
 William Strahan's service record
 Commonwealth War Graves Commission Lone Pine memorial location

1869 births
1915 deaths
Australian military personnel killed in World War I
People from Toodyay, Western Australia
Writers from Western Australia
Gallipoli campaign
Military personnel from Western Australia
Australian Army soldiers